Israel Wood Powell may refer to:

Israel Wood Powell (Ontario politician)
Israel Wood Powell (British Columbia politician)